Howling IV: The Original Nightmare is a 1988 British direct-to-video horror film directed by John Hough from a screenplay by Freddie Rowe and Clive Turner. Starring Romy Windsor, Michael T. Weiss, Antony Hamilton, Susanne Severeid and Lamya Derval, The Original Nightmare is the fourth entry in the series of seven standalone films with loose continuity and is not so much a sequel but rather a more faithful adaptation of Gary Brandner's source novel The Howling (1977).

International Video Entertainment (IVE) released this film directly to home video in 1988. Platinum Disc Corporation (now Echo Bridge Home Entertainment) released it on DVD in 2004 and it has been released numerous times since. It was filmed on location in South Africa.

Plot
After experiencing visions of a nun, author Marie Adams (Romy Windsor) is in the middle of a meeting with her agent, Tom Billings (Antony Hamilton), when she has another vision of a wolf-like creature lunging from a fire, and begins to scream hysterically. Marie's husband, Richard (Michael T. Weiss), discusses her condition with her doctor, agreeing that Marie's overactive imagination is leading her into some dangerous territory. The doctor advises Richard to take Marie away from the pressures of her life for a few weeks. Richard locates a cottage in the small town of Drago, some hours from Los Angeles. Tom drives Marie there, but then departs quickly in the face of Richard. Marie looks around the cottage and declares it to be perfect; but that night, while she and Richard are making love, Marie is disturbed by the sound of howling out in the woods.

The next day, Marie and Richard look around Drago, where they meet the mysterious Eleanor (Lamya Derval), a local artist who owns a shop of antiques and knick-knacks, and the Ormsteads, who run the local store. Marie takes her dog for a walk, and becomes distressed when he runs off. That night, Marie dreams of wolves, of herself running through the woods, and of the same nun of whom she had visions. Richard drives into Los Angeles for a meeting, and Marie spends time chatting with Mrs. Ormstead, who tells her about the previous couple to occupy the cottage, and that they left town without a word. Marie is walking home through the woods when, suddenly, she sees before her the nun of her visions. She runs after her – but it turns out to be Eleanor in a dark cape. Eleanor points out a shortcut to the cottage, which Marie takes. She discovers a cave on the way, and what is left of her dog.

In horror, Marie runs through the woods, suddenly aware that she is being pursued. At the cottage, Richard quiets his hysterical wife and checks outside, but sees nothing; not even the dark figure nearby. The next morning, Marie witnesses a strange apparition: an elderly man and woman who appear in her living room and who warn her to go away. Marie is momentarily distracted by a car pulling up outside, and the next instant her ghostly visitors are gone. The newcomer is Janice Hatch (Susanne Severeid), who is holidaying in the area and is a fan of Marie's writing. Marie invites her in and, as they are talking, mentions the howling that she hears at night.

After some hesitation, Janice reveals that she used to be a nun, and that her closest friend, Sister Ruth (Megan Kruskal), disappeared over a year ago, only to be found in Drago speaking incoherently of the devil, a bell, and the sound of howling. After a long illness, Ruth died without ever being able to explain what happened to her; and Janice, determined to discover the truth, left the convent. Marie is disturbed by the mention of a nun, and becomes even more so when Janice shows her a photograph of Sister Ruth: it is the nun from her visions. Meanwhile, Richard, becoming frustrated with Marie's instability and visions, becomes drawn to Eleanor and sleeps with her.

Marie eventually learns that all the inhabitants of the village are werewolves and Sister Ruth was babbling "Werewolves are here", rather than "We're all in fear", as everyone had assumed. When she tells Richard what she has learned, he angrily dismisses her claims and goes for a walk in the woods by their house. As he is walking, he sees Eleanor seemingly waiting for him, leading to the pair becoming intimate. Eleanor turned heel during their tryst, as she transformed into a werewolf and bit Richard before running off. He stumbles back to the house and tells Marie he saw the werewolf. But that night after being examined by the town doctor, he claims he just fell down. Richard begins acting strangely and the next night, as he is walking in the woods, transforms into a werewolf as the villagers, who are also revealed as werewolves look on and then attempt to attack Marie.

Marie escapes and following the storyline of the original folk tale she lures the inhabitants to the local church using its bell and then burns them all alive, including Richard. The film ends with a burning werewolf lunging at Marie out of the fire just as she had foretold in her vision.

Cast
 Romy Windsor as Marie Adams
 Michael T. Weiss as Richard Adams
 Antony Hamilton as Tom Billings
 Susanne Severeid as Janice Hatch
 Lamya Derval as Eleanor
 Norman Anstey as Sheriff
 Kate Edwards as Mrs. Ormstead
 Dennis Folbigge as Dr. Coombs
 Anthony James as Father Camefrom
 Dale Cutts as Dr. Heinemann
 William Forsche as Werewolf

Production
Shooting took place in South Africa.

Music
The film's theme song "Something Evil, Something Dangerous" was performed by Justin Hayward, lead singer of The Moody Blues.

Reception
In Horror Films of the 1980s, author John Kenneth Muir rated it 1.5/4 stars. Scott Aaron Stine wrote in The Gorehound's Guide to Splatter Films of the 1980s that the film is "completely generic" and a rehash of the original. Mike Mayo, who wrote The Horror Show Guide: The Ultimate Frightfest of Movies, called it unsuspenseful and said the film's only connection to the series is its title. Craig J. Clark of The A.V. Club wrote the script, low budget, and poor special effects prevent the film from becoming suspenseful.

Sequels
Co-writer Clive Turner appears in the film as a tow truck driver. Turner also worked on the subsequent Howling V: The Rebirth, Howling VI: The Freaks and wrote and directed the seventh film in the Howling series, The Howling: New Moon Rising.

References

External links
 
 
 

1988 films
1980s supernatural horror films
British supernatural horror films
British independent films
1980s English-language films
The Howling films
Direct-to-video horror films
Films based on horror novels
Direct-to-video sequel films
British werewolf films
Films directed by John Hough
1988 independent films
1980s British films